The Turkey national football team represents Turkey in men's international football matches. The team is controlled by the Turkish Football Federation, the governing body for football in Turkey, which was founded in 1923 and has been a member of FIFA since 1923 and UEFA since 1962. It has been recognized as Türkiye by the FIFA and UEFA since 2022.

The team played their first official international game in 1923 and has represented the nation in major competitions since their debut appearance at the 1924 Summer Olympics. They have participated in Summer Olympics a total of six times (1924, 1928, 1936, 1948, 1952 and 1960), and reached the quarter-finals twice, in 1948 and 1952.

The team enjoyed their highest achievements in the 2000s, most notably finishing in third place at the 2002 FIFA World Cup and the 2003 FIFA Confederations Cup, and reaching the semi-finals at UEFA Euro 2008. They qualified for FIFA World Cup three times (1950, 1954 and 2002) and reached the semi-finals in 2002, winning bronze medals. The team qualified for UEFA European Championships five times. Making their debut at Euro 96, they reached the quarter-finals in Euro 2000 and semi-finals in Euro 2008. In recent years, Turkey qualified to the Euro 2016 and Euro 2020 championships.

Since its introduction in 1992, the FIFA World Rankings have ranked Turkey between 5th and 57th place. Following their success at the 2002 World Cup, Turkey managed to stay in the top 10 in rankings between 2002 and 2004, ranking at 5th in June 2004. The team climbed once again up to 10th place in December 2008, following their success at Euro 2008. Turkey achieved their highest victory margin with 7–0 wins over Syria in 1949, South Korea in 1954 and San Marino in 1996, while their biggest losses were 8–0 defeats to Poland in 1968 and England in 1984 and 1987.

, the most capped player to play on the national team is Rüştü Reçber with 120 senior international caps between 1994 and 2012, and the most scoring player is Hakan Şükür with 51 goals scored between 1992 and 2007. The longest-serving captain is Turgay Şeren with captaincy of 35 international encounters from 1950 to 1966.

History

Early years

The Turkish National Team's first game was against Romania, played on 26 October 1923 at Taksim Stadium in Istanbul, a 2-2 draw "A National Team History", Turkish Football Federation.  Zeki Rıza Sporel is considered as the first big star of Turkish football as he scored the first two goals against Romania. Turkey played their first ever official match at the 1924 Summer Olympics losing to Czechoslovakia, 5–2.

1950 FIFA World Cup
Although Turkey qualified for the 1950 World Cup, beating Syria 7–0, they were forced to withdraw from the tournament due to financial problems.

1954 FIFA World Cup
Turkey then qualified for the 1954 World Cup after a play-off with Spain. The Turkish team first lost 4–1 to Spain, but a 1–0 win a few days later initiated a replay. On that occasion, they tied 2–2 after, booking their place after a coin toss. Turkey was put in a group along with Hungary and West Germany. The Turks, however, never played Hungary due to the tournament format, and a 4–1 defeat by the Germans was followed by Turkey carrying out a 7–0 win over South Korea. Turkey lost the play-off to West Germany 7–2. In 1956, however, Turkey did play Hungary in a friendly match in Istanbul, defeating what was one of the strongest teams of the era, 3–1. Lefter Küçükandonyadis, arguably one of the best Turkish strikers of all time, scored two goals during the tournament.

Near misses

Despite the introduction of a national league, and showings by Turkish clubs in European competition, the 1960s would be a barren time for the national team. Most players from the 1954 World Cup squad were retired, and the new generation of players failed to qualify for a major tournament. The 1970s saw Turkey holding back in the World Cup and UEFA European Championship qualifiers, but the team was a point too short to qualify for both UEFA Euro 1972 and Euro 1976. In the 1980s the Turkish team also suffered their worst defeats with 8–0 scorelines against Poland and twice against England. Yet the 1990 World Cup qualifiers would mark a turning point for Turkish football, with Turkey only missing out on qualification in the final match. Prominent players in this period included Rıdvan Dilmen, Oğuz Çetin, Rıza Çalımbay, Feyyaz Uçar, and European Golden Boot winner Tanju Çolak.

1990–1996
In 1990, coach Sepp Piontek was put in charge of the national team. Under his guidance, a group of new players debuted for the national team. Many of these players (which included Bülent Korkmaz, Alpay Özalan, Sergen Yalçın, Rüştü Reçber, and Hakan Şükür) would become the backbone of the national team for many years. Piontek's mission came to an end in 1993, where he was replaced by Fatih Terim, who in turn managed to qualify for Euro 1996. Turkey qualified for its first major tournament since 1954, marking another turning point for Turkish football. The appointment of Piontek was a recommended move by another coach, Jupp Derwall, who had coached Galatasaray for three seasons. Derwall is regarded as the revolutionizer of Turkish football, since his introduction of training techniques and tactical ideas to the Turkish game also heavily influenced the national team.

Euro 1996

Turkey qualified for Euro 1996, defeating both Switzerland and Sweden 2–1 during qualification. Despite a solid performance during the qualifiers, Turkey lost all their matches without scoring a single goal. They did, however, go home with an award: the fair play award, given to Alpay Özalan.

Euro 2000
Although Turkey failed to qualify for the 1998 World Cup, they qualified for Euro 2000 after winning a play-off against the Republic of Ireland. Turkey lost their first match 2–1 to Italy, they drew their second match against Sweden 0–0, and beat host nation Belgium 2–0, making it the first time in the history of the UEFA European Championship a host nation had been eliminated in the first round. This victory brought Turkey into the last eight of the tournament, where they were beaten 2–0 by Portugal, with Arif Erdem missing a critical penalty.

2002 FIFA World Cup

For the 2002 World Cup, Turkey finished second in their qualifying group, despite starting well and being the favourites to top the group. They lost 2–1 to Sweden in the crucial match that would decide the top spot. The Turks were forced to play the play-offs against Austria. They defeated the Austrians 6–0 on aggregate and booked their place at the finals. The Turkish team started the 2002 World Cup with a 2–1 defeat against eventual winners Brazil. Turkey qualified from the group stage with a 3–0 win against China PR after drawing 1–1 with Costa Rica.

Turkey then faced home team Japan in the second round, winning 1–0. The Turkish team continued their run, as they beat Senegal 1–0 on a golden goal to book their place in the semi-finals, where a 1–0 defeat against eventual tournament winners Brazil forced them to play the third place match, and a bronze medal was won after a 3–2 victory over co-hosts South Korea. Hakan Şükür scored Turkey's first goal in 10.8 seconds, even when the South Koreans kicked off first. It was the fastest goal in World Cup history.
Tens of thousands of flag-waving Turkish fans greeted the World Cup squad on their return to Istanbul, where they joined a massive street party at Taksim Square. Rüştü Reçber, Alpay Özalan and Hasan Şaş were all included in the All-Star Team, with Reçber also being voted as the best goalkeeper in the UEFA Team of the Year 2002, while Şenol Güneş was being voted as the best manager.

2003 FIFA Confederations Cup
In the summer of 2003, Turkey reached third place at the 2003 FIFA Confederations Cup. In the group stages, Turkey defeated the United States 2–1 before losing to Cameroon 0–1. In their final group match, Turkey drew 2–2 against Brazil, eliminating them from the tournament. Turkey lost to eventual tournament winners France 3–2 in the semi-final match. Turkey then defeated Colombia 2–1 to win the bronze medal. Tuncay scored three goals and made an assist, which won him the Silver Shoe Award and the Silver Ball Award for the second best player of the tournament.

Euro 2004
The Turkish team failed to qualify for Euro 2004 on play-offs due to a loss to Latvia after finishing second in their group. This marked a turning point for the national team as new players were introduced to the national team to create a new generation.

2006 FIFA World Cup
The Turkish team once again narrowly missed out on the World Cup finals after failing to win a play-off, this time on away goals against Switzerland, again after finishing second in their group. There were scenes of violence after the game on and off the pitch where the Turkish team brawled with Swiss players down the tunnel.

Euro 2008
Turkey qualified for their first international tournament in six years by finishing second behind Greece in Euro 2008 qualifying Group C to reach the Euro 2008 final stages. They were placed alongside Switzerland, Portugal and the Czech Republic in Group A. In their first match, they played Portugal and were beaten 2–0, but wins over Switzerland (2–1) and the Czech Republic (3–2) – both secured by late goals – brought qualification for the knockout stages. Again, Turkey knocked out a host nation – Switzerland – in the group stages for the second time.

The quarter-final against Croatia was goalless after 90 minutes, and Croatia led 1–0 in the final minute of extra time, but another late Turkish goal by forward Semih Şentürk brought the game to penalties. The goal raised some controversy with Croatia fans and Croatia head coach Slaven Bilić, who claimed that the goal had been scored after extra time had elapsed. This complaint, however, was overruled, and the game went into penalties. Turkey defeated Croatia in penalties, 3–1.

Turkey went into the semi-final against Germany with just 14 outfield players available as a result of injuries and suspensions, but scored first and were drawing 2–2. But they finished third by default after losing 3–2 with a last minute goal by Philipp Lahm. Both Russia and Turkey were given bronze medals in the dressing rooms after the semi-finals.

2010 FIFA World Cup
Turkey were drawn in UEFA Group 5 together with Armenia, Belgium, Bosnia and Herzegovina, Estonia and Spain. Turkey had a mixed qualifying campaign, finishing with 15 points and missing out on a play-off place to Bosnia and Herzegovina with 19 points. Spain topped the group to qualify, winning every game in the process. Coach Fatih Terim announced he would be resigning his post following their failure to qualify.

Euro 2012

Turkey were drawn in Group A in qualification for Euro 2012, together with Kazakhstan, Austria, Belgium, Germany and Azerbaijan. The Turkish team reached the play-offs after beating Azerbaijan 1–0 but got eliminated 3–0 on aggregate by Croatia.
On 14 November 2012, Turkey celebrated their 500th match in a friendly game played against Denmark at the Türk Telekom Arena, Istanbul, which ended in a 1–1 draw. Before the match, footballers and coaches, who contributed to the national team's success in the past, were honoured. Turkish pop singer Hadise, who wore a national team jersey with the number 500, performed a small concert.

2014 FIFA World Cup
Turkey were drawn in Group D in qualification for the 2014 World Cup, together with Andorra, Estonia, Hungary, the Netherlands and Romania, finishing fourth. Turkey began to lose critical points during qualification and Abdullah Avcı was sacked soon after. Fatih Terim was put in charge for the third time to lead the national team, but a 2–0 defeat against the Netherlands ended hopes of qualification.

Euro 2016

Turkey were drawn in Group A in the qualification campaign for the Euro 2016, together with Iceland, Latvia, Kazakhstan, the Netherlands and the Czech Republic. The Turkish team qualified for their first major tournament in eight years as the best third-placed team after beating Iceland 1–0, with Selçuk İnan netting a free kick in the 89th minute. After over 18 months unbeaten, a loss to England as a pre-tournament friendly ended the team's winning streak, subsequently leading to back-to-back losses against Croatia and Spain in the tournament. Turkey won their last game against the Czech Republic, 2–0. They were minutes away from reaching the last 16, until a late winner for Ireland against Italy meant that the latter instead qualified as one of the best third-placed teams. Despite elimination, youngster Emre Mor's skillful display and assist during the game revealed a hopeful future for Turkish football.

2018 FIFA World Cup
Turkey were drawn in UEFA Group I for the 2018 World Cup qualifying campaign. together with Croatia, Finland, Iceland, Kosovo and Ukraine. During the qualifiers, head coach Fatih Terim stood down after an off-field incident, and 72-year-old former Romania manager Mircea Lucescu took over. After eight games, Turkey stood a strong chance of qualifying for the tournament, but a 0–3 defeat against Iceland at home ended automatic qualification hopes. After a 2–2 draw against Finland the team finished fourth in Group I.

2018–19 UEFA Nations League
Turkey was drawn with Russia and Sweden in the 2018–19 UEFA Nations League B and Turkey had a poor performance which led the country to finish bottom. At the first game held at home against 2018 World Cup host and quarter-finalist Russia, Turkey lost 1–2 despite an equalizer by Serdar Aziz. Turkey then put up its best performance in the League, winning 3–2 against Sweden right in Swedish soil. However, Turkey could not capitalize on this opportunity and lost 0–2 to Russia in Sochi before suffering a humiliating 0–1 home loss to Sweden, thus initially sent Turkey to League C. However, UEFA rule changes meant Turkey was allowed to remain in League B.

Euro 2020
Turkey were drawn in group H in the qualifying stage along with the 2018 FIFA World Cup champions France, as well as Iceland, Albania, Moldova and Andorra. Veteran coach Şenol Güneş revolutionised the team, with many young talents, combining them with experienced players like Burak Yılmaz and Emre Belözoglu. The team restructuring proved to be genius, as Turkey had one of the best campaigns in recent history.

Turkey managed to achieve a 2–0 victory against the group favourites France in Konya and later a 1–1 draw at Stade de France. Turkey struggled against the group underdogs Andorra in their first match against them, winning by a 89th-minute goal at the Vodafone Arena in Istanbul. Turkey's only defeat in the group came against Iceland in Reykjavik, losing 2–1. The defeat came after ill-treatment of the Turkish group at the Iceland customs, keeping them at the airport for 3 hours. This was followed by an Icelandic supporter holding a toilet brush to team captain Emre Belozoglu as a pretend microphone during an interview. The events were heavily criticised by the Turkish and European media. In an interview Turkish Coach Şenol Güneş, said that had come here 40 years ago, nothing had changed about the stadium and the country, except that some Icelandic people had lost the hospitality they had 40 years ago. Turkey entered matchday 9 against Iceland as group leaders with 19 points. Turkey and Iceland were drawn 0–0 at Turk Telekom Arena in Istanbul. Though unable to defeat Iceland and losing the first place to France, a draw was enough to secure Turkey a spot in Euro 2020 finals, ahead of their away match against Andorra.

Turkey had the honor of opening the Euro 2020 Finals but it soon turned to be a night to forget for the Turkish. Turkey kicked off the European Championship with a 3–0 loss against Italy in Group A at the Olympic Stadium with Ciro Immobile and Lorenzo Insigne on target. Roberto Mancini's side had been frustrated by Turkey's defensive approach in the first half but broke through in the 53rd minute when a hard-hit cross from Domenico Berardi flew in off Turkey defender Merih Demiral for an own goal. They went to lose the next two games from both Switzerland and Wales, losing all three games in a row alongside debutants North Macedonia.

2020–21 UEFA Nations League
After qualifying for Euro 2020, Turkey entered with momentum, even though they had to face old foe Russia, alongside Hungary and Serbia in the 2020–21 UEFA Nations League B.

However, despite all these improvements, Turkey performed poorly in their two opening games in September 2020. The first game against Hungary at home saw Turkey suffer a 0–1 loss by a free kick from Dominik Szoboszlai. Going to Belgrade against Serbia, after repeated Serbian pressure, Turkey had a one-man advantage following Aleksandar Kolarov's red card, however the Turks failed to capitalise and were held goalless. This damaged their chances of qualifying for League A, as their next opponents in October will be Russia (who had had a strong start) and Hungary. The early poor performance could also represent a detrimental effect for Turkey, as this season's Nations League was used for the 2022 FIFA World Cup qualification process.

Turkey continued to find its first win in the Nations League. Against Russia in Moscow, a team which Turkey has failed to win in Russian soil since its last win at 1966 and still finding its first win over the Russians since 1975 in general, Turkey once again failed to register a win, though they got an encouraging 1–1 draw thanked for Kenan Karaman's equaliser. Yet, the Turkish side disappointed with only a 2–2 draw over Serbia at home soil.

November 2020 proved to be very important as Turkey must gain important wins in order to stay or even better getting possible promotion. Their first game in this month's Nations League was against Russia, but Denis Cheryshev scored an early lead making the Turkish side looked hapless. Yet, a red card to Andrey Semyonov proved to be a game changer, and with a one-man advantage, the Turks turned the deficit to finally break down its winless run against Russia with a 3–2 home win. The Turks then traveled to Hungary with hope that a win against the Hungarians could mean possible promotion, at least if Russia lost to Serbia. However, while Russia suffered a humiliating 0–5 defeat away in Belgrade, Turkey failed to gain the advantage and instead lost 2–0 by the Hungarians, despite late pressure to find an equalizer in the second half. That meant Turkey and Serbia were tied on points, but with the Serbians scored two goals away from home in contrast to Turkey's failure to do the same in Belgrade, Turkey was relegated for the second time (the first season saw Turkey stayed due to Nations League overhauls) to 2022–23 UEFA Nations League C. Such outcome also meant Turkey will have to fight in order to get a direct 2022 FIFA World Cup ticket as play-off qualification appeared to be slim with their relegation, in which the 2022 World Cup qualifiers will occur in March 2021, which they did.

Kit suppliers

Rivalries 

Turkey has developed several notable rivalries, the most well-known being with Croatia and Greece.

Turkey and Croatia have played each other nine times, with their first encounter at Euro 1996; where both countries made their debuts in the opening match, which Croatia won 1–0. A well-remembered match between them was at Euro 2008, which Turkey won on penalties after a 1–1 deadlock even after extra-time. With the win, Turkey reached the semi-finals in only their third appearance overall at the Euro finals. The two teams faced each other in the 2012 Euro qualifying play-offs, with Croatia winning 3–0 in the first-leg in Istanbul, and advancing to the tournament finals following a 0–0 draw in the second-leg. The two teams faced each other once again in a European competition at Euro 2016, playing in the opening match of Group D; with Croatia winning 1–0 through a sensational Luka Modrić volley. Only three months after the match at the Euros, the two teams played in their opening match in Group I of 2018 FIFA World Cup qualifying, which finished 1–1. Exactly one year after this, Turkey won the reverse fixture 1–0 at home, which played a key part in both countries' qualifying campaign, although Turkey would not qualify for World Cup while Croatia would go on to qualify and finish second in that edition.

Turkey also has a historical rivalry with Greece; having played them a total of 14 times, winning eight, drawing three and losing three games. Both countries have been described as "punching above their weight"; with Greece winning Euro 2004 despite being classified as underdogs prior to the competition, and Turkey followed-up their World Cup bronze medal in 2002 by advancing to the semi-finals of Euro 2008, where they were knocked out by Germany. Due to tension between the two countries and the dispute over Cyprus, coupled with several incidents occurring during matches between Turkish and Greek clubs, it has been described as one of the biggest international football rivalries.

Results and fixtures

2022

2023

Coaching staff

Players

Current squad
The following players were called up for the friendly matches against Scotland on 16 November 2022 and Czech Republic on 19 November 2022.

Caps and goals are correct as of 19 November 2022, after the match against Czech Republic.

Recent call-ups
The following players have been called up for the team within the last twelve months.

Notes
PRE = Preliminary squad/standby.
INJ = Not part of the current squad due to injury.
SUS = Player is suspended.
RET = Retired from international football.
COV = The player is not part of the current squad due to testing positive for COVID-19.

Player records

Most capped players

Players in bold are still available to play in Turkey national team.

Top goalscorers

Players in bold are still available to play in Turkey national team.

Most clean sheets

Players in bold are still available to play in Turkey national team.

Centuriate goals

As of 29 September 2020:

Competitive record

FIFA World Cup

UEFA European Championship

UEFA Nations League

FIFA Confederations Cup

Olympic Games

1968–1988 see Turkey national amateur football team. Football at the Summer Olympics has been an under-23 tournament since 1992.

Mediterranean Games

Mediterranean Cup

 1949
 1953
 1958

Balkan Cup

ECO Cup

Head-to-head record
The following table shows Turkey's all-time international record, as of 19 November  2022.

Honours
FIFA World Cup
Third place (1): 2002
FIFA Confederations Cup
Third place (1): 2003
UEFA European Championship
Semi-finals (1): 2008

Decoration
In 2002, the national team was honored with the Turkish "State Medal of Distinguished Service" for their third place achievement at the 2002 FIFA World Cup. All the team members, coaches and officials were given medals.

See also

Turkey national under-21 football team
Turkey national under-20 football team
Turkey national under-19 football team
Turkey national under-17 football team
Turkey national youth football team

References
Notes

Citations

Bibliography

External links

 
Turkey at FIFA 
Turkey at UEFA

 Turkey National Football Team
European national association football teams
Football in Turkey
Recipients of the State Medal of Distinguished Service